The Parish Church of San Silvestro is a parish church dedicated to Saint Sylvester located in the municipality of Larciano, in the province of Pistoia, in Tuscany, Italy.

The property belongs to the Diocese of San Miniato (FI).

History 
This parish church is dedicated to Saint Sylvester because, during his pontificate in the fourth century, the population converted to Christianity. So, when Pope Sylvester died and was sanctified shortly after, the church was dedicated to him.  It had previously been a pagan temple and had already been transformed into a church and dedicated to Saint Martin.

This would confirm the hypothesis according to which the building dates back to the Christianity period; however, there are no traces left, even no traces of subsequent reconstructions in Romanesque forms, with the exception of some internal structures.

Interior 
Inside, the only one nave was lengthened and the apse demolished and replaced with a Latin cross transept and a rectangular apse. On the counter-façade, there is the organ, perhaps the oldest one in the Valdinievole area (probably of the sixteenth or seventeenth century), with an exhibit in carved, painted, and gilded wood. At the entrance, two seventeenth-century holy water fonts are situated. The right one is set on a fifteenth-century column; inside a niche, a beautiful hexagonal marble baptismal font can be found, supported by a pedestal with a band. The latter carries the Medici coat of arms (the ancient one of Larciano, the wild boar) and the one of the Gori family who had built it in 1532, as the inscription shows. Some argue, however, that the Gori family represents the workers of the factory, donors of the work. A curious and interesting painting depicts the miracles of St. Anthony between St. Francis and St. Michael the Archangel (1663). At the center of the choir, a nineteenth-century painting with St. Sylvester baptizing Costantino by Bartolomeo Valiani.

The main altar was built with sandstone and stucco in 1748, but, during the early nineteenth century, it underwent some rebuilding works, bringing to light the walnut choir, still located inside the church. On the altars, there are various pictorial works, among which one depicts St. Anthony of Padua, St. Francis, and St. Michael the Archangel and contains an altar-piece with St. Anthony holding baby Jesus, another shows seven scenes of the saint's miracles, divided by panels with small cherubs supporting a cartouche. On the back, there is the following inscription: "This panel was made of alms from the citizens of Larciano on the advice of Piero di Antonio di Vincenzo di Bartolo di Giovanni, prior of Larciano the year of the foundation of this office 1663".

References

External links 

 Christian churches in Tuscany
Parish church of San Silvestro in Larciano
Parish church of San Silvestro among other churches in Tuscany

Churches in the province of Pistoia